Murat Ruslanovich Gomleshko (born 5 January 1970) is a Russian professional football coach and a former player.

Honours
 Russian Third League Zone 2 top scorer: 1997 (16 goals).

Personal life
His son Ruslan Gomleshko is a professional footballer.

External links
 

1970 births
Sportspeople from Krasnodar
Living people
Soviet footballers
Russian footballers
Association football forwards
FC Kuban Krasnodar players
Kapaz PFK players
FC Spartak Semey players
FC Aktobe players
Russian Premier League players
Azerbaijan Premier League players
Kazakhstan Premier League players
Russian expatriate footballers
Expatriate footballers in Azerbaijan
Expatriate footballers in Kazakhstan
Russian expatriate sportspeople in Kazakhstan
Russian football managers
FC Dynamo Stavropol managers